Jacques Desallangre (6 September 1935 – 17 January 2020) was a member of the National Assembly of France.  He represented the Aisne department, and was a member of the Gauche démocrate et républicaine. 

Desallangre was born in Châlons-en-Champagne, Marne. Formerly a left-wing independent, he joined the new Left Party in November 2008.

References

1935 births
2020 deaths
People from Châlons-en-Champagne
Left Party (France) politicians
Deputies of the 11th National Assembly of the French Fifth Republic
Deputies of the 12th National Assembly of the French Fifth Republic
Deputies of the 13th National Assembly of the French Fifth Republic